Lebia humeralis is a species of ground beetles in the Harpalinae subfamily that can be found in Austria, Bulgaria, Czech Republic, Greece, Hungary, Italy (including Sardinia and Sicily), Moldova, Romania, Slovakia, Switzerland, Ukraine, and in all Yugoslavian states and southern part of Russia.

References

Lebia
Beetles described in 1825
Beetles of Europe
Taxa named by Pierre François Marie Auguste Dejean